Heen Banda Udurawana (15 December 1900 – 31 August 1989) was a member of the Senate of Ceylon and Diyawadana Nilame of the Temple of the Tooth, Kandy.

Born at Udurawana, Wattegama; he was educated at Christ Church College, Wattegama and at the School of Agriculture, Alawatugoda. He became a planter, businessman, contractor and transport agent.

He was elected to the Kandy Municipal Council in 1948 and served as Deputy Mayor and acted as Mayor on certain occasions. From 1967 to 1971 he was a member of the Senate of Ceylon.

In 1948, was elected Basnayaka Nilame of Saman Devalaya, Alawatugoda and later became the Basnayaka Nilame of the Natha Devale in Kandy in 1958. He was elected the 16th Diyawadana Nilame, the lay custodian of the Sacred Tooth Relic in 1964 and held it till 1975, when he was succeeded by Nissanka Wijeyeratne.

See also
Diyawadana Nilame, Sri Dalada Maligawa, Kandy

References and External links	
Official Website
WorldGenWeb Website
Daily News Newspaper
The Island Newspaper

Diyawadana Nilames
Sinhalese politicians
United National Party politicians
Members of the Senate of Ceylon
1900 births
1989 deaths
Mayors of Kandy